The men's 30 metre team rapid fire pistol was a shooting sports event held as part of the Shooting at the 1920 Summer Olympics programme. It was the second and last appearance of the event. The competition was held on 3 August 1920, and 45 shooters from 9 nations competed.

Results

The scores of the five shooters on each team were summed to give a team score. The maximum score was 1500.

References

External links
 Official Report
 

Shooting at the 1920 Summer Olympics